Torgau-Oschatz is a former district (Kreis) in Saxony, Germany. It was bounded by (from the north and clockwise) the district Wittenberg in Saxony-Anhalt, the district Elbe-Elster in Brandenburg, and the districts Riesa-Großenhain, Döbeln, Muldentalkreis and Delitzsch.

History 
The district was created in 1994 by merging the two previous districts Oschatz and Torgau, and 6 municipalities from the former district Eilenburg. In August 2008, as a part of the district reform in Saxony, the districts of Delitzsch and Torgau-Oschatz were merged into the new district Nordsachsen.

Geography 
The main river in the district is the Elbe, which meanders through water meadows. The landscape is dominated by three heath areas, the Dahlener Heide (150 km²) in the south, the Düben Heath (110 km²) in the northwest, and partially the Annaburger Heide in the east.

Coat of arms

Towns and municipalities

External links 
  (German)